The Bangladesh cricket team was touring New Zealand for a single Test match, a three-match ODI series, and one Twenty20 International from 3 to 19 February 2010. This was 'The National Bank' Series.

New Zealand started the series with a ten wicket victory in the Twenty20 International, dismissing Bangladesh for 78, the second lowest score by a full member of the International Cricket Council (ICC).

New Zealand registered a clean sweep by winning the ODI series 3-0 and the Test series 1–0.

Squads

T20I series

Only T20I

ODI series

1st ODI

2nd ODI

3rd ODI

Test series

Only Test

Media coverage

Television
SET Max (repeat) - India (The Next Day After The Match) ...1am to 8.30am
Sky Sport (Live) - New Zealand
Bangladesh Television (live) - Bangladesh
Sky Sports (live) - United Kingdom
DirecTV (live) - United States of America
Supersport (live) – South Africa, Kenya and Zimbabwe
Arab Digital Distribution (live) - United Arab Emirates

References

2010 in New Zealand cricket
2010 in Bangladeshi cricket
2009–10 New Zealand cricket season
2009-10
International cricket competitions in 2009–10